Carlos Gómez Barrera (19 May 1918 – 17 March 1996) was a Mexican musician and composer, union leader and syndicate leader of the composers. He was born in Payo Obispo (now Chetumal), Quintana Roo on 19 May 1918 and died in Mexico City, 17 March 1996.

Education
Carlos Gómez Barrera began his elementary studies in the city of Chetumal, later transferring to Mexico City and he began studies in the National School of Agriculture in Chapingo which he did not complete as a result of health problems.

Career
On 1 May 1958 he was elected Secretary General of the composers section of the International Federation of Film Production in Mexico, a position to which she was later reelected for eight consecutive periods. In addition she was secretary general of the syndicated miso for two periods, from 1968 to 1970 and from 1976 to 1978, plus she was the first president of the Federation of Mesoamerican Authors, producers and performers.

He was elected Member of Parliament by the Federal Electoral District of Quintana  Roo, to the L. Legislature from 1976 to 1979. He  was declared Quintana Roo's favorite son on 17 November 1973.

Works
He soon became completely dedicated to musical compositions. His first composition was La Marcha for the Quintana Roo reserves. He entered this song into a contest to select the national march for the reserves. This event was organized by El Universal in 1943. Barrera placed tenth nationally and first for Quintana Roo. He later compiled other compositions dedicated to his native town including: Leyenda de Chetumal (Legend of Chetumal), Cozumel, Navidad en Isla Mujeres (Christmas in Mujeres Island), Mi homenaje a Cancún (My tribute to Cancun), Inútil es fingir (Useless to pretend), Milagro de amor (Miracle of love), Falsos Juramentos (False oaths), Que me castigue Dios (That God would punish me), Mentira (Lie), Tú eres mi destino (You are my destiny) and Por un puñado de oro (For a piece of gold).

1918 births
Mexican musicians
Institutional Revolutionary Party politicians
1996 deaths
Deputies of the L Legislature of Mexico
Members of the Chamber of Deputies (Mexico) for Quintana Roo